Simple Machines was an American independent record label in Arlington, Virginia. The label was founded by Jenny Toomey and Brad Sigal while both were living in the Positive Force House in north Arlington, but Sigal soon stepped back from involvement. Kristin Thomson stepped up and co-masterminded the project with Toomey and they started a new group house near Positive Force's. At its peak, the label had four paid workers: Toomey, Thomson, Pat Graham and Mickey Menard. The label was formed to "find creative ways to avoid the established and boring music business."

Biography
The label came into existence in 1990 with the release of the Simple Machines 7" series. The Working Holiday! 7" series followed. Simple Machines promoted cooperation with other indie labels all over the United States, and the "sell it at a fair price" ethic. The label also released a compilation of bands covering their "favourite Beat Happening covers". The profits were donated to a youth at risk home in Washington D.C.

The most famous release of the label is Pocketwatch, an album recorded by Dave Grohl, the Foo Fighters frontman, who was at the time the drummer for Seattle-based grunge band Nirvana. Unwilling to use his own name on the record, Grohl used the moniker "Late!", and was listed in liner notes as "Dave G". The album was released in 1 "Petrol CB".

The Mechanic's Guide
As part of the label's DIY attitude towards the music industry, they published a 24-page guide that was believed to be responsible for helping to set up many independent labels throughout the 1990s. The guide gives detailed advice on many aspects of the music industry from recording and releasing singles through to the legal requirements of setting up a label as a legitimate business.

Closure
Following Thomson's relocation to Philadelphia with her husband, and the subsequent six-hour weekly commute, Simple Machines found themselves under increasing financial pressures to keep putting out records and keeping them in print. Toomey and Thomson had also become disenchanted with the business aspect of their label, realizing that it overruled the musical side of it. In 1997 the decision was made to wind the label down.

The label released two final records by artists Ida and Tsunami, respectively. Toomey and Thomson organised a Simple Machines Finale Party at the Black Cat in Washington D.C. with 24 bands on the bill which took two days to conclude. On March 29, 1997, Simple Machines closed.

Roster
Autoclave
Bricks
Franklin Bruno
Grenadine
Dave Grohl
The Hated
Danielle Howle
Ida
Liquorice
Lois
Lungfish
Mommyheads
Monorchid
My Dad Is Dead
Rastro!
The Raymond Brake
Retsin
Scrawl
Sea Saw
Tsunami

References

Record labels established in 1990
Record labels disestablished in 1998
Alternative rock record labels
American independent record labels